Rahimkhan Chalabianloo or Rahim Khan Chalabianlu, was a Kurdish government official in power around the turn of the 19th century in Iran. He was from the Chalabianlu tribe and executed in 1911.

Biography 
According to the official documents Rahim Khan's ancestors had been exiled to the north of Arasbaran region by advancing Russian forces during the Russo-Persian War (1826–28). Rahim khan served as an Army General during the era of Mozaffar ad-Din Shah Qajar.  During the brief reign of Mohammad Ali Shah Qajar, Rahim Khan as the commander of the Royal Guards was a close confidant of the king. Rahim Khan was imprisoned after the revolutionary parliament accused his son for orchestrating the massacre of 200 peasants in Arasbaran. However, after he pretended switching sides, government dispatched him to fight a Kurdish rebellion in the West Azerbaijan Province. Rahim Khan started anti-revolutionary activities as soon as he reached Ardabil and scored significant victories and completed the conquest of northeastern Azerbaijan. The revolutionary government in Tehran dispatched a well equipped force under the command of Yeprem Khan, which defeated Rahim Khan by the end of December 1909. Rahim Khan sought asylum in Russia.

In January 1911 Raḥīm Khan returned to Iran. He was soon lured to Tabrīz by the leaders of the provincial anjoman. There, first he was placed under police surveillance and, later, was incarcerated in the Ark. Finally, in September 1911, he was secretly executed during Moḥammad-ʿAlī Shah’s unsuccessful attempt to reestablish himself in power.

References

People from Tabriz
People of the Persian Constitutional Revolution
Year of birth missing
1911 deaths
People of Qajar Iran